Towneley is a surname, and may refer to:

People

The Towneley family of England
 Charles Townley (1 October 1737 – 3 January 1805[1]), British antiquary
 Caroline Theresa Towneley (1838–1873), British heiress
 Charles Towneley (MP) (1803–1870), Irish Independent Irish Party and Whig politician
 Francis Towneley (1709–1746), English Catholic and Jacobite
 Henry Towneley Green (1836–1899), English watercolourist and illustrator
 John Towneley (politician) (1806–1878), English Whig politician
 John Towneley (translator) (1697–1782), English supporter of the Jacobite Rising of 1745
 Montagu Towneley-Bertie, 13th Earl of Lindsey (2 November 1887 – 11 September 1963), English peer
 Richard de Towneley (MP) (c. 1313 – 16 April 1381), English landowner and politician
 Richard Towneley (1629–1707), English mathematician, natural philosopher and astronomer
 Simon Towneley (1921–2022), British author

Barons O'Hagan
 Baron O'Hagan (the title)
 Thomas O'Hagan, Baron O'Hagan (1812–1885)
 who married in 1871 Alice Towneley, daughter and co-heiress of Colonel Charles Towneley, from whom his heirs take the name
 Thomas Towneley O'Hagan, 2nd Baron O'Hagan (5 December 1878 – 13 December 1900)
 Maurice Towneley-O'Hagan, 3rd Baron O'Hagan (20 February 1882 – 18 December 1961)
 Charles Towneley Strachey, 4th Baron O'Hagan (b. 1945)

Places and institutions
 Mary Towneley Loop, a circular route along the border of Lancashire and Yorkshire
 Towneley Colliery or Towneley Desmesne, coal mine in Lancashire
 Towneley High School founded 1941 in Lancashire
 Towneley Park in Lancashire
 Towneley railway station in Lancashire
 Towneley Stadium, a former racing stadium in Lancashire

Arts
 Towneley Mystery Plays